The Rengasdengklok Incident (Indonesian: Peristiwa Rengasdengklok) was the kidnapping of Sukarno and Hatta done by several youths (pemuda), including Sukarni, Wikana, Aidit and Chairul Saleh. This incident occurred on August 16, 1945 in the early hours of the morning, at around 4am. Sukarno and Hatta were taken to Rengasdengklok, Karawang, to then be urged to proclaim of the independence of the Republic of Indonesia, until an agreement was reached between the older group represented by Sukarno, Hatta and Achmad Soebardjo and the pemuda group about when the proclamation would be carried out, especially after Japan suffered defeat in the Pacific War.

The kidnapping of Sukarno and Hatta and their confinement in Rengasdengklok was the peak of the disagreement between the older and pemuda groups over how to carry out the proclamation of independence. In a critical situation, the two groups agreed to proclaim independence on August 17, 1945. Sukarno and Hatta were initially taken to the Defenders of the Homeland (PETA) dormitory in Rengasdengklok. Because this location was deemed unsafe, they were then moved to the house of a man named Djiauw Kie Siong. In Rengasdengklok, the pemuda group again spoke to Sukarno, demanding that the proclamation be carried out immediately.

The purpose of the kidnappings as reported by the Ministry of Education and Culture of the Republic of Indonesia, were:

 To urge Sukarno and Hatta to immediately convey the Proclamation of Indonesian Independence because at that time there was a vacuum of power due to Japan's surrender to the Allies.
 To keep Sukarno and Hatta away from Japanese influence.
 To show the proclamation as the struggle of the Indonesian people, that must be immediately formulated and read.
 To prevent Indonesia from falling into the hands of the Allies because of the vacuum of power from the Japanese side in Indonesia.

Background 
Field Marshall Hisaichi Terauchi made the decision to form the Preparatory Committee for Indonesian Independence (Indonesian: Panitian Persiapan Kemerdekaan Indonesia or PPKI) on August 7, 1945. The formation of PPKI implied that the Indonesian people were free to express their opinions and carry out activities according to their ability.  At that time Sukarno and Hatta, wanted the proclamation to be carried out through the PPKI, while the pemuda group wanted it to be carried out as soon as possible without going through PPKI, which they considered to be a Japanese-made body. In addition, this was done so that Sukarno and Hatta were not influenced by the Japanese. The pemuda were worried that independence, which they saw as the result of the struggle of the Indonesian people, would seem as if it were a gift from Japan.

Release
The next morning, Admiral Maeda learned that Sukarno and Hatta had been kidnapped. The results of the search and investigation then led to the suspicion falling on Wikana, who was then urged to immediately return the two men to Jakarta. Achmad Soebardjo picked them up from Rengasdengklok after Admiral Maeda guaranteed their security and promised there would be no interference from Japan in the independence proclamation.

References

1945 in Indonesia
Sukarno
Kidnapping in Indonesia